Budhanilkantha School, often referred to as BNKS, is a competitive public boarding school in Nepal. It is located in Narayanthan, 8 kilometres north of Kathmandu, at the foothills of Shivapuri mountain. It is named after the Budhanilkantha Temple, which is located nearby.

One third of pupils admitted in grade five are granted scholarships based on need, after an entrance examination held in all the 77 districts of Nepal. This scholarship is granted every year to the students until grade 10.

History

Budhanilkantha School was established in 1972 as a joint venture between the governments of Nepal and the United Kingdom. The first batch of students took the School Leaving Certificate Examination (the national exam that is equivalent to the British O level) in 1980. In 1983, English was made the official language of instruction at Budhanilkantha School. Cambridge International A level and O level, administered by CAIE of the University of Cambridge was introduced in 1985 and 1986 respectively.

Budhanilkantha School converted from a boys' single-sex school to a co-educational institution in 1992. 

In 1994, administration of the school was handed over from British to Nepali management.

Overview
The school is a full boarding school for students from fifth grade to A level, aged 10 to 19.

Although the school is governed as a Public Educational Trust, it charges tuition fees for most students and also receives funding from the Ministry of Education. This makes the school a blend of private and public school. Approximately one-third of the students receive scholarships based on merit and need.

Academics
The school operates three courses of study:
School Leaving Certificate level (a nationwide curriculum up to class 10 prescribed by the Department of Education of Nepal),
 Cambridge International A-Level
 10+2 Level (Higher Secondary Education Board of Nepal, an equivalent alternative to A-Level).

Students must pass an entrance exam to gain admission into the school. Normally, entrance examinations are taken for entry into class 5 and post SLC levels. This is intended to continue the high academic status of the school.

Out of 118 students who took the School Leaving Certificate Examination 2014, 103 secured Distinction and the rest 15 students passed in the First Division.

Budhanilkantha School was the first school to introduce GCE Advanced Level in Nepal. It currently offers A-Levels in Physics, Chemistry, Biology, Mathematics, Further Mathematics, Economics, Business Studies, Computer Science, Accounting and English Language. It is compulsory for students to sit exams in five subjects. Mathematics and English Language have to be studied by all students. Most students choose to study science-based subjects and some choose to combine sciences and social sciences. In A-Level exams of the year 2010, 12% of entries from the school secured grade A* and 30% entries secured grade A. 56% entries from the school secured more than or equal to grade B. 73% of the total entries, excluding General Paper, was on either math or science subjects. Budhanilkantha students regularly feature in the Cambridge Outstanding Learner Awards as the best achieving A-Level candidates in Nepal and worldwide.

Governance
The school is managed under the Public Educational Trust. The Ministry for Education being the main trustee, the Board of Trustees (BOT) is chaired by the Education Secretary of Nepal. The School Management Committee (SMC) is responsible for the formulation, implementation, and monitoring of all policy-level matters. The Principal takes care of the day-to-day administration with the help of two Vice-Principals, Chief Administrative Officer and a team of Senior Management Team SMT. The school is also supported by Friends of Budhanilkantha School (FOBS), the parents' representative association and the Society of Ex-Budhanilkantha Students (SEBS). They also actively participate in the school governance.

The present principal of the school is Hom Nath Acharya. There are currently two vice principals in the school; Mr. Deepak Kayastha and Mrs. Timila Shakya Acharya.

The list of Headmasters/Principals of the school are as follows:

 John B Tyson,  Headmaster Designate (1966)
 Peter J Wakeman, Headmaster (1972 to 1977)
 Ken Jones, Headmaster (1978 to 1982)
 Dr. Tej Ratna Kansakar, Acting Headmaster (1983)
 John Tyson, Headmaster (1983 to 1988)
 Brian Garton, Headmaster (1989 to 1992)
 Thomas sopnil, Headmaster (1992 to 1994)
 Satyanarayan Rajbhandari, Principal (1994 to 1995)
 Narayan Prasad Sharma, Principal (1996 to 2012)
 Keshar Khulal, Principal (2013 to 2019)
 Hom Nath Acharya, Principal (2019 to present)

Notable alumni
Bartika Eam Rai (singer/ songwriter/ poet)
Bhusan Dahal (media personality)
Dipendra Bir Bikram Shah Dev (late King of Nepal)
Jeevan Bahadur Shahi, (Politician)
Karun Thapa (media and IT expert)
Nabin K Bhattarai (singer)
Paras Bir Bikram Shah, ex-Crown Prince of Nepal
Nirajan Shah (late Prince of Nepal)
Sumana Shrestha, Member of Parliament
Swarnim Wagle (former Vice-chairman of National Planning Commission)
Ujwal Thapa, late President of Bibeksheel Nepali
Surya Karki, co-founder of Bloom Nepal School and UWS Nepal

References

External links

 Budhanilkantha School website
 Budhanilkantha School on WikiNepal

Boarding schools in Nepal
Cambridge schools in Nepal
Educational institutions established in 1972
Schools in Kathmandu
Secondary schools in Nepal
1972 establishments in Nepal